Orlat Cemetery may refer to:
Cemetery of the Defenders of Lwów, in Lviv, Ukraine
An archeological site in Uzbekistan, see Orlat plaques
Orlat cemetery, Hungary